Flavius Bauto (died c. 385) was a Romanised Frank who served as a magister militum of the Roman Empire and imperial advisor under Valentinian II.

Biography
When the usurper Magnus Maximus invaded Italy in an attempt to replace Valentinian II, Bauto led military defence against him. According to bishop Ambrose, Maximus accused Bauto of attacking him with barbarian troops and intending to establish a puppet emperor in the figure of Valentinian II to acquire sovereignty for himself. In matters of religion, Bauto was likely a Christian. He and Rumoridus, who was pagan, were present before Valentinian II when Ambrose successfully convinced the emperor against Quintus Aurelius Symmachus' proposal to restore the pagan Altar of Victory, which had been earlier removed from the Senate of Rome. Afterwards, the two men went along with Valentinian II's decision.

He became a consul in 385 but died soon after, likely of natural causes. Afterwards, his daughter Aelia Eudoxia resided in the house of a son of Promotus, a nemesis of Rufinus, and later married Emperor Arcadius in 395, becoming one of the more powerful empresses of the period. His military office was succeeded by Arbogastes, who went on to influence Valentinian II and is claimed by John of Antioch to be Bauto's son.

Notes

380s deaths
4th-century Frankish people
4th-century Romans
4th-century Roman consuls
Frankish warriors
Generals of Theodosius I
Imperial Roman consuls
Magistri militum
Year of death uncertain
Year of birth unknown